Alice Donadel, stagename Alice Dona (Maisons-Alfort, 17 February 1946) is a French singer and songwriter. Born to an Italian father from Veneto and a French mother, both musicians.

As a singer she recorded 11 singles from 1963 to 1965 among them "Demain, j'ai dix-sept ans", "Surboum 63", "Mon train de banlieue", and "Avec Toi", co-written with Jacques Demarny, her entry for the Rose de France song competition in 1966. After starting a family she then turned more to songwriting and provided a series of hits for other French singers during the 1970s.

Selected compositions
 Ton côté du lit, Le général a dit and La fan, for Joe Dassin ;
 Les amants sont maigres, les maris sont gras, for Régine (singer) ;
 Qu’attends-tu de moi, Des prières, Un oiseau chante, for Mireille Mathieu ;
 Un homme a traversé la mer, for Enrico Macias ;
 C'est écrit, for Sheila (singer) ;
 Combien faudra-t-il de temps, for Hervé Vilard ;
 Le monsieur qui passe, Ma dernière volonté, Le barbier de Belleville, for Serge Reggiani ;
 Tables séparées, for Dalida ;
 Deux bateaux ; Le dernier baiser, for Annie Girardot ;
 Riche, for Sylvie Vartan ;
 C’est de l’eau, c’est du vent, Les ballons et les billes, Le musée de ma vie, Un peu d’amour, beaucoup de haine, Merci merci beaucoup, L'anneau dans la rivière and Gens qui pleurent, Gens qui rient, for Claude François.
 Je suis malade for Serge Lama ; Dalida ; Lara Fabian ;

References

1946 births
Living people
French singer-songwriters
People from Maisons-Alfort
French people of Italian descent
People of Venetian descent